The Opeongo River is a river in the Saint Lawrence River drainage basin in Nipissing District in northeastern Ontario, Canada. The river is entirely within Algonquin Provincial Park and Opeongo River Provincial Park, except for a small portion around Victoria Lake, and is a left tributary of the Madawaska River.

Course
The river begins in Algonquin Provincial Park at the outflow from Annie Bay on the East Arm of Opeongo Lake in geographic Preston Township, in the Unorganized South Part of Nipissing District, controlled by the Opeongo Lake Dam and flows southeast to Booth Lake. It exits the lake east controlled by the Booth Lake Dam, enters geographic Clancy Township, exits Algonquin Provincial Park into Opeongo River Provincial Park and reaches Victoria Lake. The river leaves the lake at the northeast over a dam and continues southeast, passes from Unorganized South Nipissing District into the geographic Dickens Township in the municipality of South Algonquin, passes through a series of rapids, takes in the left tributary Aylen River, turns southwest, and empties into Bark Lake on the Madawaska River, at the Ontario Highway 60 bridge and east of the community of Madawaska. The Madawaska River flows via the Ottawa River to the Saint Lawrence River.

Recreation
The river is used for recreational canoeing and kayaking.

Tributaries
Aylen River (left)
Victoria Lake
McNevin Creek (right)
Shall Lake
Oram Creek (right)
Shall Creek (left)
Crotch Lake
Shirley Creek (left)
Robin Creek (left)
Bridle Creek (left)
Booth Lake
Rumley Creek (right)
Cob Creek (right)
McCarthy Creek (right)
Chipmunk Creek (left)
Tip Up Creek (left)

See also
List of rivers of Ontario

References

Other map sources:

Rivers of Nipissing District
Tributaries of the Ottawa River